Meghan Montgomery (born November 6, 1981) is a Canadian Paralympic rower who competes in international events in the mixed coxed four, she is born with a congenital disability in her right hand.

She has participated in three Summer Paralympics in rowing and has won a bronze medal in the 2016 Summer Paralympics.

References

External links
 
 

1981 births
Living people
University of Manitoba alumni
Canadian female rowers
Medalists at the 2016 Summer Paralympics
Paralympic rowers of Canada
Rowers at the 2008 Summer Paralympics
Rowers at the 2012 Summer Paralympics
Rowers at the 2016 Summer Paralympics
Rowers from Winnipeg
Paralympic bronze medalists for Canada
Paralympic medalists in rowing